Arnel Pineda is the first studio album by vocalist Arnel Pineda, several years before he became the lead singer of Journey (former lead singer of The Zoo).  Released in 1999 on the Warner Bros. record label, the album was a success in the Philippines where two singles achieved radio play: "Iiyak Ka Rin" and "Sayang". The album was re-released on iTunes for download (catalog no. 398429923-4).

Track listing
"Sayang" ("What A Waste") (Cajipe, Monet) - 4:48
"Bitin" ("Not Enough") (Cajipe, Monet) - 4:36
"Iiyak Ka Rin" ("You Too Will Cry") (Pineda, Arnel) - 4:29
"You're The One" (Cajipe, Monet) - 5:07
"Free Bird" (Pineda, Arnel) - 4:16
"Mi Vida, Mi Amor" ("My Life, My Love") (Pineda, Arnel) - 4:10
"For My Own Good" (Pineda, Arnel) - 3:45
"Isa Pang Pagkakataon" ("One More Chance") (Sanchez, Kedy) - 3:59
"It's Over" (Cajipe, Monet) - 4:48
"Problema" ("Problem") (Cajipe, Monet) - 3:11

Personnel
 Arnel Pineda: Lead vocals, vocal arrangement
 Johnny Castaneda: Guitar
 Kedy Sanchez: Guitar, producer, vocal arrangement
 Michael Alba: Drums
 Dean Arriola: Artist direction
 Don Manalang: Engineer
 Nikki Cunanan: Engineer
 Jerry Joanino: Engineer
 Isaias Nalasa: Arranger
 Reuben Laurente: Vocal arrangement
 Ricky Ilacad: Executive Producer

References

1999 debut albums
Arnel Pineda albums